Julian Martin (born Melbourne 1969) is an Australian artist, known primarily for his pastel drawings and self-portraits. Martin resides in the Melbourne suburb of Doncaster, and has worked from his Northcote-based studio at Arts Project Australia since 1989, where he has also had numerous solo shows.  He has exhibited widely, both nationally and internationally [see Exhibitions] and in 1994 he was a finalist in the prestigious Moët & Chandon Travelling Fellowship. In 2014 he was the winner of the Australian State Trustees Connected art prize. His work is held in several public collections, including the Deakin University Art Collection, the City of Melbourne Art and Heritage Collection and Monash University Museum of Art.

Early life and education 
Martin was diagnosed with autism at the age of two and was supported and encouraged by his parents, who claimed that his diagnosis had ‘cemented’ their family and that he showed signs of ‘promise.’ He attended a program for special-needs children, but did not start making art until approximately the age of ten. During his time at an autism-specific school, which he attended for several years, he “won a minor art prize,” however the early promise identified by his parents was not realised until 1989, when an instructor at the Adult Day Centre at which Martin attended recognised his artistic talent. Shortly thereafter he began working at Arts Project Australia, an organisation devoted to supporting and promoting artists with an intellectual disability.  Although Martin received no formal training, his participation in the studio program at Arts Project Australia gave him access to fine art materials and the informal tuition provided by the practicing artists employed by the organisation.  It was one such artist who, in the early 1990s, suggested the use of a mirror as a drawing aid, which eventually led to the development of his signature depictions of mask-like faces executed in pastel. These early works were exhibited in Martin's first solo show, entitled Pastel Drawings at the Australian Galleries in Collingwood, Melbourne.

Career, themes and style 
Both Martin's lack of formal training and autism have identified him as one of the key figures within the Outsider Art category in Australia.  This categorisation is confirmed by his repeated inclusion in Outsider Art exhibitions and fairs, both in Australia and in the USA. However, in recent years his work has also achieved success in more conventional art institutions and Alex Baker, former curator of contemporary art at the National Gallery of Victoria has likened his works to those of American Abstract artists of the 1930s and 1940s such as Adolph Gottlieb, William Baziotes and Ad Reinhardt, claiming that they are similarly characterised by “pictographic, biomorphic and hard-edged abstraction.”

A highly prolific artist whose works number in the hundreds and are stored in the archival collection of Arts Project Australia, Martin's work has developed from early abstracted monochrome figures and profiles into a practice which combines source material found in newspapers and magazines with the bold, flattened geometric repetition of form that has become his “signature style.” Recent works are drawn from mainly photographic and physical sources ranging from depictions of Hollywood celebrities, politicians and sports stars to an eclectic range of kitchen utensils, tools, letters and logos. The expansion of subject matter in recent work has been accompanied with a more textural and layered use of the familiar pastel medium - Baker notes the use of etching implements to create works which are “abraded, scoured and pitted,” stating that they stand as “testimony to the artist’s vigorous process.”

Solo exhibitions 
 Julian Martin Solo, No Vacancy Project Space, Melbourne, 2015 
 Julian Martin: Transformer, Arts Project Australia Gallery, Melbourne, 2014
 Julian Martin New Work, Kitty Somerset, Northcote, 2011
 Draw, Manningham Gallery, Melbourne, 2009
 Julian Martin Recent Works, Arts Project Australia Gallery, Melbourne, 2006
 New Works, Arts Project Australia Gallery, Melbourne, 2003
 Sempiternal Variations, Arts Project Australia Gallery, Melbourne, 2001
 Pastel Drawings, Australian Galleries, Collingwood, 1995

Selected group exhibitions 
 Here and Now, Sofitel Melbourne on Collins, Melbourne, 2016
 Measurably Long Kool, Fleisher Ollman, Philadelphia, USA, 2016
 Paper Projects, La Trobe University, Melbourne, 2016
 The Outsider Art Fair 2015, (Fleisher/Ollman booth), New York, USA, 2016; 2015; 2014; 2009
 The Salon, Scott Livesey Galleries, Melbourne, 2015
 Down The Rabbit Hole, Arts Project Australia Gallery, Melbourne, 2015 
 Connected, Yarra Gallery, Federation Square, Melbourne, 2014; 2010; 2009; 2003–2007;1999
 Everyday imagining: new perspectives on Outsider art, The Ian Potter Museum of Art, The University of Melbourne, 2014
 Melbourne Art Fair, Royal Exhibition Building, Melbourne, 2014; 2012; 2010; 2008; 2006; 2004; 2002; 2000
 6° of Separation, Arts Project Australia Gallery, Melbourne, 2014
 Renegades: Outsider Art, Moree Plains Gallery, Moree, NSW, 2014
 National Works on Paper, Mornington Peninsula Regional Gallery, 2014; 2000; 1998
 Animal Magnetism, Arts Project Australia Gallery, Melbourne, 2014
 Renegades: Outsider Art, The Arts Centre Gold Coast, Surfers Paradise, QLD, 2014
 The Armory Show, (Fleisher/Ollman booth), New York, USA, 2014
 Rick Amor Drawing Prize, Art Gallery of Ballarat, Victoria, 2014
 Chicago Expo: Fleisher/Ollman Gallery, Chicago USA,2013
 Renegades: Outsider Art, KickArts Contemporary Arts, Cairns QLD, 2013
 Outsiderism, Fleisher/Ollman, Philadelphia, USA, 2013
 At the Table, Arts Project Australia, Melbourne, 2013
 Halo and the Glory of Art, McGlade Gallery, ACU Sydney, 2012
 Paint It Black, Arts Project Australia Gallery, Melbourne, 2012
 Exhibition #4, Museum of Everything, London, 2011
 Colour My World, Arts Project Australia Gallery, Melbourne, 2011 
 Hidden, Arts Project Australia Gallery, Melbourne, 2010
 Myscape, Trongate & Collins Gallery, Strathclyde University, Glasgow, Scotland, 2010
 Snapshot, ACGA Gallery, Federation Square, Melbourne, 2009
 Pictures of You, Arts Project Australia Gallery, Melbourne, 2009
 Alan Constable & Julian Martin, Australian Galleries, Melbourne, 2009
 Pearls of Arts Project Australia, Stuart Purves Collection, NSW, 2009; 2008; 2007
 Lets Get Lost, Arts Project Australia Gallery, Melbourne
 In Everyone’s Company, Arts Project Australia Gallery, Melbourne, 2006
 Australian Outsiders, Jack Fischer Gallery, California, USA, 2006
 Leo Cussen with Selected Artists, Australian Galleries, Collingwood, 2005
 South of the Border, Arts Project Australia Gallery, Melbourne, 2005
 Dealer’s Choice, Phyllis Kind Gallery, New York, USA, 2005
 2nd Annual Intuit Show of Folk and Outsider Art, Chicago, United States, 2005, New York
 Visual Disobedience, Arts Project Australia Gallery, Melbourne, 2005
 A Sense of Place, Arts Project Australia Gallery, Melbourne, 2003
 Fair Game, NGV Response Gallery, Melbourne, 2003
 Headspace, National Neuroscience Facility, Melbourne, 2003
 Suburban Dreamers, Moore's Building, Fremantle, 2002
 Art of the Sacred Heart, Greenaway Art Gallery, Adelaide, 2001
 Face-Up, Idiom Studio, Wellington, New Zealand, 2001
 Histoires de vivre, Musée du Louvre, Paris, 2000
 Arterial - artists from Arts Project Australia, Paralympic Arts Festival, Sydney Opera House, Sydney, 2000
 On Track, Arts Project Australia Gallery, Melbourne
 Artists from Arts Project Australia, Australian Galleries Works on Paper, Sydney, 1999
 Nillumbik Art Award, Melbourne, 1999
 La Femme, Arts Project Australia Gallery, Melbourne, 1999
 Bazaar, Pitspace, RMIT, Bundoora, 1998
 Knock Knock group show, Australian Galleries, Melbourne, 1997
 Prints and Artists Books, Arts Project Australia Gallery, Melbourne, 1997
 Drawing on Experience: Reflections on Popular Culture (National touring exhibition), Arts Project Australia Gallery, Melbourne, 1996
 Border Crossing, McClelland Regional Gallery, Langwarrin, Victoria, 1996
 Eyes on the Ball, National Touring Exhibition, MOMA (Heide), Melbourne, 1996
 Art des Antipodes, MADMusée, Liège, Belgium, 1995
 Vita Gallery, Portland, Oregon, USA, 1995
 Reversed Image, Arts Project Australia Gallery, Melbourne, 1995
 Moët et Chandon Travelling Exhibition, National Gallery of Victoria, Melbourne, 1994
 Beyond Words, National Gallery of Victoria, VicHealth Access Gallery, 1994
 Working Art, Arts Project Australia Gallery, Melbourne, 1994
 Artists from Arts Project, Artist's Garden, Fitzroy, 1990

Publications 
Julian Martin: Transformer, exhibition catalogue, Arts Project Australia, Melbourne, 2014.

Collections 
 Deakin University, VIC
 City of Melbourne, VIC
 Monash University Museum of Art, VIC
 Ecovantage, VIC
 STOARC, NSW
 Concept Economics, Canberra, Private Collection of Henry Ergas

References

External links 
 http://www.fleisher-ollmangallery.com/shows/2016/06_kool 
 http://www.artsproject.org.au/artworks/154/Julian%20Martin 
 http://julianartist.com/

Abstract artists
21st-century Australian artists
Australian people with disabilities
Outsider artists
Artists from Melbourne
Artists with autism
1969 births
Living people